Loricariinae is a subfamily of the family Loricariidae of catfish (order Siluriformes). This subfamily is divided into two tribes and about 30 genera. They are mainly native to freshwater habitats in South America, but there are also several species (in genera Crossoloricaria, Dasyloricaria, Fonchiiichthys, Rineloricaria, Spatuloricaria, Sturisoma and Sturisomatichthys) in Panama and a single (Fonchiiichthys) in Costa Rica.

Taxonomy
Loricariinae was first described in 1831. Later, in 1979, many genera were described and Loricariinae was divided into four subfamilies: Loricariini, Harttiini, Farlowellini, and Acestridiini. Eventually, the genera of Acestridiini was included under Hypoptopomatinae and genera of Farlowellini was reclassified into Hartiini. This subfamily has been found to be monophyletic. The most recent papers conclude that there are 30 or 31 genera; the status of Cteniloricaria is dubious; although recognized as a synonym of Harttia by some, this conclusion was reached without diagnosing the type species of Cteniloricaria.

Description
As loricariids, loricariinae species are characterized by a depressed body covered by bony plates, a unique pair of maxillary barbels, and modification of the mouth into a suckermouth. Members of the subfamily Loricariinae show a greater diversity of lip structures and shapes than other loricariids. Loricariines are characterized by a long and depressed caudal peduncle (rectangular cross-section) and by the absence of an adipose fin. They also show dramatic variation in body shape, lip morphology and dentition. The sexual dimorphism is often pronounced and is expressed through the hypertrophy of odontodes on the pectoral fin rays, on the snout margin, and sometimes on the predorsal area of mature males. Certain genera also show sexual differences in lip and tooth structures.

The Harttiini are characterized by numerous and pedunculated teeth, a caudal fin with more branched rays, the absence of postorbital notches and predorsal keels, a rounded mouth, papillose lips weakly or not fringed, and short maxillary barbels. The Loricariini are characterized by a more important variation in lips and teeth shape, the frequent presence of postorbital notches and predorsal keels, longer maxillary barbels, and less numerous teeth and branched rays in the caudal fin.

Genera
Genera list based on Covain and Fisch-Muller (2007), except for Cteniloricaria.

Tribe Loricariini
Loricaria group
Brochiloricaria
Loricaria
Paraloricaria
Proloricaria
Ricola
Loricariichthys group
Furcodontichthys
Hemiodontichthys
Limatulichthys
Loricariichthys
Pseudoloricaria
Pseudohemiodon group
Apistoloricaria
Crossoloricaria
Dentectus
Planiloricaria
Pseudohemiodon
Pyxiloricaria
Reganella
Rhadinoloricaria
Rineloricaria group
Dasyloricaria
Fonchiiichthys
Ixinandria
Rineloricaria
Spatuloricaria
Tribe Harttiini
Aposturisoma
Cteniloricaria
Farlowella
Harttia
Harttiella
Lamontichthys
Metaloricaria
Pterosturisoma
Sturisoma
Sturisomatichthys

References

Loricariidae
Fish of South America
Fish subfamilies
Taxa named by Charles Lucien Bonaparte